Khem Raj Nepali (Nepali: खेमराज नेपाली) is a Nepalese communist politician and member of the National Assembly. In 2018 he was elected in Province No. 1 for the Communist Party of Nepal (Unified Marxist–Leninist) with a two-year term.

In 2013 he ran for the Constituent Assembly election for the Unified Communist Party of Nepal (Maoist).

References 

Living people
Nepal Communist Party (NCP) politicians
Members of the National Assembly (Nepal)
Communist Party of Nepal (Unified Marxist–Leninist) politicians
Year of birth missing (living people)